The Masan Stadium was a multi-purpose stadium in Changwon, South Korea. The stadium has a capacity of 21,484 people. The stadium opened in 1982 and has a gymnasium, indoor swimming pool, and tennis courts. It is currently used mostly for football matches.

The stadium was demolished in 2016.

Gallery

References

External links
 Gyeongnam Sports Facilities Management Center 
 Masan Stadium  
 World Stadiums

Athletics (track and field) venues in South Korea
Football venues in South Korea
Multi-purpose stadiums in South Korea
Sports venues in Changwon
Sports venues completed in 1982
1982 establishments in South Korea
Sports venues demolished in 2016
Demolished sports venues
Venues of the 2002 Asian Games
Asian Games football venues
20th-century architecture in South Korea